Verrucaria kiyosumiensis is a species saxicolous (rock-dwelling), crustose lichen in the family Verrucariaceae. Found in semi-freshwater habitats in Chiba Prefecture, central Japan, it was formally described as a new species in 2001 by lichenologist Hiroshi Harada. The lichen has almost spherical, exposed black perithecia measuring 0.15–0.25 mm in diameter, and dark purplish brown perithecial walls lacking a distinct involucrellum. The periphyses are 10–15 μm long with pointed apices, and its ascospores have dimensions of 12–16 by 5–7 μm. The lichen has an indistinct thallus.

See also
List of Verrucaria species

References

kiyosumiensis
Lichen species
Lichens described in 2001
Lichens of Japan